Hrvatski Top Model Season 1 was the first Season of a reality documentary based on Tyra Banks' America's Next Top Model which  pits contestants against each other in a variety of competitions to determine who will win title of the new Croatian Top Model as well as a modelling contract with an agency in hopes of a promising career start in the modeling industry.

The season was aired from April to June 2008 and hosted by Tatjana Jurić and featured sixteen contestants (originally fifteen with one being replaced by a semifinalist after she quit).
Croatian Fashion Designer Marco Grubnic also had several appearances on the first Season to introduce the girls to the fashion industry and give them constructive criticism.

The winner will receive a 1-year contract with Major Model Management in Milan, a spread in the Croatian issue of Joy Magazine, a 5-day trip to New York City sponsored by Maybelline and a 2-week English course in London.

After thirteen weeks, Sabina Behlić was named the winner of the first Season beating Valentina Dropulić and Marina Jerković in the final.
In 2010 the show was also shown in Slovenia on TV3 under the name  Hrvaški Top Model.

Contestants
(ages stated are at start of contest)

Semi-finalists

Finalists

Summaries

Call-out order

 The contestant quit the competition
 The contestant was eliminated
 The contestant was the original eliminee but was saved
 The contestant won the competition

 In Episode 1, 24 semi-finalists were chosen out of 4,000 applicants.
 In Episode 2, 15 girls that would move on in the main competition were chosen. Marija decided to quit the competition. She was replaced by Andrea the following episode.
 In Episode 4, Neda decided to quit the competition.
 Episode 7 was the recap Episode.
 The judging for episode 8 was prolonged into the beginning of the following episode. Kristina's  exit was shown in episode 9.
 Nobody was eliminated in episode 9.

Photo shoot guide
 Episode 2 photo shoot: Wind tunnel
 Episode 3 photo shoot: Snow editorial for Joy
 Episode 4 photo shoot: Water photo shoot
 Episode 5 photo shoot: Summer and winter  
 Episode 6 photo shoot: Vogue dance  
 Episode 7 photo shoot: Auto show  
 Episode 8 photo shoot: Posing with snakes
 Episode 9 photo shoot: Diamonds are a girl's best friend
 Episode 10 photo shoots: Wildlife; B&W lookbook
 Episode 11 photo shoot: Body painting
 Episode 12 photo shoot: Painter, cat woman and Dita Von Teese

References

External links
 Official Website
 Constantin Entertainment Production Website

Croatia
2008 American television seasons